Route 9 is the name of several highways.

Route 9 may also refer to:

 Route 9 (acapella group), a singing group based at Amherst College, Massachusetts, United States
 Route 9 (public transport), a list of public-transport routes numbered 9
 Route 9 (film), a 1998 American film starring Kyle MacLachlan